Papilio menatius is a butterfly of the family Papilionidae.

Description
Uppersides of the wings are black with yellowish bands and yellowish submarginal lines of spots.

The subspecies P. m. menatius present in Guyana is black with white spots at the center of the forewings. On the hindwings there are a submarginal row of red lines and a line of spots partly red and partly white. Subspecies P. m. victorinus is treated as a species by some authors.

The larvae of P. m. victorinus feed on Persea americana. Adults feed on flower nectar of various plants, including Lantana and Impatiens species.

Taxonomy
Papilio menatius is in the subgenus Pterourus Scopoli, 1777 which also includes the species groups: troilus species group, glaucus species group, the zagreus species group and the scamander species group. Papilio menatius is a member of the homerus species group. The members of this clade are:
Papilio cacicus Lucas, 1852
Papilio euterpinus Salvin & Godman, 1868
Papilio garamas (Geyer, [1829])
Papilio homerus Fabricius, 1793
Papilio menatius (Hübner, [1819])
Papilio warscewiczii Hopffer, 1865
and the enigmatic Papilio judicael known only from a handful of specimens and either a valid species from the Andean region, or a hybrid P. menatius × P. warscewiczii.

Subspecies
The following subspecies of Papilio menatius are recognised:
P. m. menatius (Surinam, French Guiana)
P. m. cleotas Gray, 1832 (Brazil (Santa Catarina, Rio de Janeiro) to Argentina)
P. m. coelebs Rothschild & Jordan, 1906 (Peru)
P. m. coroebus C. Felder & R. Felder, 1861 (Colombia, Venezuela)
P. m. ctesiades Rothschild & Jordan, 1906 (Peru, Brazil (Amazonas, São Paulo))
P. m. eurotas C. Felder & R. Felder, 1862 (Ecuador, Peru)
P. m. laetitia Butler, 1872 (Costa Rica, Panama)
P. m. lemoulti Rousseau-Decelle, 1933 (Venezuela)
P. m. lenaeus Doubleday, 1846 (Bolivia, Peru)
P. m. morelius Rothschild & Jordan, 1906 (western Mexico)
P. m. syndemis (Tyler, Brown & Wilson, 1994) (Colombia)
P. m. victorinus Doubleday, 1844 (eastern Mexico to Nicaragua) - victorine swallowtail
P. m. vulneratus Butler, 1872 (Costa Rica)

Distribution
This species can be found in southern North America and in most of South America (Mexico, Nicaragua, Costa Rica, Panama, Ecuador, Suriname, Guyana, Colombia, Bolivia, Venezuela, Argentina, Brazil and Peru).

Gallery

References

"Papilio menatius (Hübner, [1819])". Insecta.pro. Retrieved February 5, 2020.
"Pterourus m. menatius (Hübner, [1819)"]. Butterflies of America. Retrieved February 5, 2020.
Lewis, H. L. (1974). Butterflies of the World.  Page 24, figure 18 (ssp. cleotas): page 25 figure 14 (ssp. victorinus).

External links

menatius
Papilionidae of South America
Butterflies described in 1819